Aktawat Sakoolchan (born 8 September 1972) is a retired Thai sprinter who specialized in the 400 metres and 4x400 metre relay. He represented his country at the 1992 Summer Olympics in both events, finishing 5th and 6th in his heats, respectively.

He won two silver medals at the 1991 Asian Athletics Championships in Kuala Lumpur, and then broke the 400m national and Southeast Asian Games records at the 1995 Southeast Asian Games in Chiang Mai, recording a 46.05 second run. The records stood for 20 years before both were broken by Kunanon Sukkaew in 2015 with a 46.00 time.

References

External links
 Aktawat Sakoolchan profile at Sports-Reference.com

Living people
1972 births
Aktawat Sakoolchan
Athletes (track and field) at the 1992 Summer Olympics
Aktawat Sakoolchan
Athletes (track and field) at the 1994 Asian Games
Aktawat Sakoolchan
Aktawat Sakoolchan
Asian Games medalists in athletics (track and field)
Medalists at the 1994 Asian Games
Southeast Asian Games medalists in athletics
Aktawat Sakoolchan
Competitors at the 1991 Southeast Asian Games
Competitors at the 1995 Southeast Asian Games
Aktawat Sakoolchan
Aktawat Sakoolchan